Palazzo Tognetti is a palace in Grosseto, Italy.

It is an Art Nouveau style building on three floors located along Corso Carducci.

History
The palace was commissioned by the Tognetti brothers who owned a news agency in Grosseto. It was designed by engineer-artist Giuseppe Luciani and inaugurated in 1910.

It has richly decorated façades and it is considered one of the best examples of Stile Liberty in Grosseto and southern Tuscany.

References

Bibliography

See also
Art Nouveau
Grosseto

External links 
 

Tognetti
Art Nouveau architecture in Italy
Houses completed in 1910